The Fish Files is a 2001 adventure game developed by the Italian team 7th Sense and published by MC2-Microïds on the Game Boy Color.

Gameplay and plot
The player takes control on Dante, a college student in search of his kidnapped fish, Ramada. His quest takes him to various cities and towns, as well as other time periods.

The gameplay is in the tradition of Lucasarts point and click adventure titles.

Reception
Adventure Gamers praised the game for its surreal characters and amusing storyline. Jeux Video felt the game alone was justification enough for a customer to purchase a Game Boy.

References

External links

2001 video games
Europe-exclusive video games
Point-and-click adventure games
Single-player video games
Game Boy Color games
Game Boy Color-only games
Video games about time travel
Video games developed in Italy
Video games with underwater settings